Theophilus North is a 1973 autobiographical novel, the last novel written by Thornton Wilder. In 1988 it was adapted for the film Mr. North.

Plot summary 
In 1926 Theophilus North, 29 years old, leaves his four years employment at a New Jersey school and goes to Newport, Rhode Island, to buy a car that a friend sold him. He has no idea what to do next in his life. Arrived in the city, he decides to remain there. He tries to get an income giving private lessons and as a reader for $2.00 per hour, but soon his ability in solving problems helps introduce him to Newport's high society.

Characters 
 Theophilus North
 Josiah Dexter
 Bill Wentworth
 Henry Simmons
 Mrs. Cranston
 Diana Bell and Hilary Jones
 Miss Wickoff
 Mr. Diefendorf
 Flora Deland
 Baron Egon Bodo von Stams

Style 
The novel is written in the first person; in fact the fictional author declares it is an abstract of a journal. However, a great part of the novel is made of dialogues between North and other characters.

There are fifteen chapters, each one treating a different episode where North is involved.

See also

References

1973 American novels
American autobiographical novels
American novels adapted into films
Harper & Row books
Novels set in Rhode Island